Football Club Concordia is a Honduran soccer club based on Olancho, Honduras.

History
The club has played in the Liga Nacional de Ascenso de Honduras.

References

Football clubs in Honduras